Phalonidia albicaput is a species of moth of the family Tortricidae. It is found in Ecuador.

The wingspan is 11–12 mm. The ground colour of the forewings is whitish creamy, glossy along the edges of the markings with pale ochreous-olive suffusions. The markings are ochreous olive. The hindwings are brownish, paler basally than on the periphery.

References

Moths described in 2002
Phalonidia